The 19th Independent Spirit Awards, honoring the best in independent filmmaking for 2003, were announced on February 28, 2004.  It was hosted by John Waters.

Nominees and winners

{| class="wikitable"
!Best Feature
!Best Director
|-
|Lost in Translation

American Splendor
In America
Raising Victor Vargas
Shattered Glass
|Sofia Coppola – Lost in Translation
Shari Springer Berman and Robert Pulcini – American Splendor
Jim Sheridan – In America
Peter Sollett – Raising Victor Vargas
Gus Van Sant – Elephant
|-
!Best Male Lead
!Best Female Lead
|-
|Bill Murray – Lost in Translation

Peter Dinklage – The Station Agent
Paul Giamatti – American Splendor
Ben Kingsley – House of Sand and Fog
Lee Pace – Soldier's Girl
|Charlize Theron – Monster
Agnes Bruckner – Blue Car
Zooey Deschanel – All the Real Girls
Samantha Morton – In America
Elisabeth Moss – Virgin
|-
!Best Supporting Male
!Best Supporting Female
|-
|Djimon Hounsou – In America

Judah Friedlander – American Splendor
Troy Garity – Soldier's Girl
Alessandro Nivola – Laurel Canyon
Peter Sarsgaard – Shattered Glass
|Shohreh Aghdashloo – House of Sand and Fog
Sarah Bolger – In America
Patricia Clarkson – Pieces of April
Hope Davis – The Secret Lives of Dentists
Frances McDormand – Laurel Canyon
|-
!Best Screenplay
!Best First Screenplay
|-
|Lost in Translation – Sofia CoppolaAmerican Splendor – Shari Springer Berman and Robert Pulcini 
A Mighty Wind – Christopher Guest, Eugene Levy (and the rest of the cast)
Pieces of April – Peter Hedges 
Shattered Glass – Billy Ray
|The Station Agent – Tom McCarthyBlue Car – Karen Moncrieff
Monster – Patty Jenkins
Raising Victor Vargas – Peter Sollett and Eva Vives
Thirteen – Catherine Hardwicke and Nikki Reed
|-
!Best First Feature
!Best Debut Performance
|-
|Monster

Bomb the System
House of Sand and Fog
Quattro Noza
Thirteen
|Nikki Reed – Thirteen
Anna Kendrick – Camp
Judy Marte – Raising Victor Vargas
Victor Rasuk – Raising Victor Vargas
Janice Richardson – Anne B. Real
|-
!Best Cinematography
!Best Documentary Feature
|-
|In America – Declan QuinnElephant – Harris Savides
Northfork – M. David Mullen
Quattro Noza – Derek Cianfrance
Shattered Glass – Mandy Walker
|The Fog of War
Mayor of the Sunset Strip
My Architect
OT: Our Town
Power Trip
|-
! colspan="2" | Best Foreign Film
|-
| colspan="2" |Whale Rider • New ZealandCity of God • Brazil
Lilya 4-Ever • Denmark
The Magdalene Sisters • England/Ireland
The Triplets of Belleville • France
|}

Special awards
John Cassavetes AwardThe Station Agent
Anne B. Real
Better Luck Tomorrow
Pieces of April
Virgin

Truer Than Fiction Award
Lost Boys of Sudan
Flag Wars
My Architect
The Same River Twice

Producers Award
Mary Jane Skalski – The Jimmy Show and The Station Agent
Callum Greene and Anthony Katagas – Happy Here and Now and Homework
Lauren Moews – Cabin Fever and Briar Patch

Someone to Watch Award
Andrew Bujalski – Funny Ha Ha
Ben Coccio – Zero Day
Ryan Eslinger – Madness and Genius

Special Distinction Award
21 Grams

Films with multiple wins and nominations

Films with multiple nominations

Films with multiple wins

External links 
2003 Spirit Awards at IMDb
Full show on Film Independent's YouTube channel

References

2003
Independent Spirit Awards